Johann Christoph Oley (1738–1789) was a German organist and composer.

Life
Nothing is known about Oley's early life, except that he was a son of Joachim Ernst Oley, a slater and brick-maker. In 1755 Johann Christoph became organist of the church of Bernburg, his home town, but in 1762 he moved to the church of St Stephan, Aschersleben, because of its more important organ. In order to improve his salary, he also took on the duties of assistant teacher at the church school. He remained at St Stephan until the end of his life. Contrary to earlier assumptions, it seems unlikely that Oley met J.S. Bach or was his pupil, but he was a copyist of Bach's keyboard works and a collector of Bach copies and prints (he owned one of the four extant copies of the Schübler Chorales).

Works
Only two publications of Oley's works have survived: 
14 variations on a polonaise for keyboard (Nuremberg, about 1767)
Various chorales for the organ (Quedlinburg, 1773), containing 77 settings for organ solo, two for solo oboe and organ, and six for organ and instrumental ensemble

References
 

1738 births
1789 deaths
People from Bernburg
18th-century German composers
18th-century keyboardists
Organists and composers in the North German tradition